Gav Koshteh (also Romanized as Gāv Koshtéh and Gāv Koshteh; also known as Gāv Kosheh) is a village in Heshmatabad Rural District, in the Central District of Dorud County, Lorestan Province, Iran. At the 2006 census, its population was 403, in 92 families.

References 

Towns and villages in Dorud County